Intlo Illalu Vantintlo Priyuralu ( Wife at home, Lover in the kitchen) is a 1996 Indian Telugu-language comedy drama  film directed by E. V. V. Satyanarayana and produced by K. L. Narayana under the Sri Durga Arts banner. It stars Daggubatu Venkatesh, Soundarya Raghu and Vineetha (in her Telugu debut) with music composed by Koti. The film was successful at the box office. The film was a remake of Tamil film Thaikulame Thaikulame.

Plot
State of being childless haunts Sriram (Venkatesh) and Sita (Soundarya), a couple with trustworthy characters. After Sriram's desperate father (Kota Srinivasa Rao) pursues him and Sita to visit a doctor for the child, they reluctantly visit Dr. Amaram (AVS). Shockingly, Sriram perceives that Sita is childless but lies to the latter and his father that he has shortcomings rather. Eventually, Sriram's father discovers the truth and asks him to marry for a second time. To escape temporarily, Sriram decides to marry once he returns after his business trip from Nepal to which Sriram's father agrees and the whole scenario is kept unaware to Sita. In Nepal, Sriram comes across Manisha (Vineetha) and due to the mistake of his friend Giri (Brahmanandam), Sriram ends up getting married to her.

After learning that Sriram is married, Manisha becomes sad but comes to terms with it and lies to the monks of her religion that she left her husband and he has no-fault. As per traditions, Manisha is to be punished by shaving her head and she had to leave the rest of her life as a widow while Sriram is asked to leave the place. However, he learns about Manisha's impending punishment, regrets it, and realizes that she truly loves him. He accepts her and returns to India in hope of telling his father, the truth but to his surprise, Sriram's father changes his mind as he realized that no one could fulfill the role of daughter-in-law as Sita has been doing and they hide the truth. After three months, Sriram learns that Manisha is pregnant with his child and brings her to India to stay in Giri's house. She gives birth to a boy but Sriram and Manisha mutually decide to lie that the boy is an orphan so that he could be adopted by Sriram and Sita and raised with all the riches.

After Sita adopts Manisha's son, Manisha leaves the place in sorrow without informing Sriram. As the infant grows to be a child, Sriram's father learns of Manisha and brings her to India. He pursues Sriram to give her a good life and live together happily with Sita and Manisha but Sriram is skeptical. Due to a series of events, Manisha ends up being employed as a maid in Sita and Sriram's home and Sita assumes that Manisha's husband eloped. Envying Manisha's growing closeness to Sriram, his father, and the child, Sita decides to get her married off but Sriram chases the groom out of the house during a formal meeting and the truth comes out. Though Giri explains the situation, Sita feels deceived and repeatedly accuses Sriram and Manisha. Enraged, Sriram's father reveals that Sriram has no shortcomings and she is infertile instead and also reveals that the child is Manisha's son, whom she sacrificed for Sita. Sita realizes her mistake and stops Manisha from leaving the house, who reluctantly accepts after her son addresses her as a mother. Giri and Sriram's father happily welcomes the trio home.

Cast
 Venkatesh as Sriram
 Soundarya as Sita, Sriram's wife
 Vineetha as Manisha, Sriram's second wife
 Brahmanandam as Giri, Sriram's friend
 Kota Srinivasa Rao as Sriram's father
 Mallikarjuna Rao as Eerinayudu, Telugu worker in Nepal
 Babu Mohan as Manager of Sriram's company branch in Nepal
 AVS as Dr. Amaram, Giri's brother-in-law and Sriram and Sita's doctor
 Ananth as Amaram's compounder
 Master Nag Anvesh as Manisha and Sriram's son

Soundtrack

Music composed by Koti. Lyrics written by Samavedham Shanmuka Sharma. Music released on Supreme Music.

Reception 
A critic from Andhra Today wrote that "A couple of good songs and good camera work make the movie worth watching".

References

External links
 

1996 films
Telugu remakes of Tamil films
Films set in Nepal
Films shot in Nepal
Films set in Hyderabad, India
Polygamy in fiction
Comedy of remarriage films
Films directed by E. V. V. Satyanarayana
1990s Telugu-language films
Films scored by Koti